Yilliminning is a small town located in the southern Wheatbelt region of Western Australia,  southeast of the state capital, Perth and  east of Narrogin.

History
The name Yilliminning is of Aboriginal origin, derived from a rock, pool and river of the same name nearby, and was first recorded in 1892. It originally had one "n", but was amended in 1944 after years of confusion about the spelling.

In 1906, the Minister for Lands visited the area, and local settlers sought his support for the declaration of a townsite. Land was set aside, a hall was erected, and lots were surveyed. The townsite of Yillimining was gazetted in July 1907, but no lots were sold due to doubts about the future of the townsite because it wasn't on the route of a proposed new railway between Narrogin (on the Great Southern Railway) and Wickepin to the northeast.

In 1909 the government constructed the new railway line west of the townsite, and established Yillimining Siding 5 kilometres west of the townsite. Demand for a new townsite to be declared arose, and the new townsite (called Yillimining) was gazetted in 1910, with the old one being cancelled.

In 2012 CBH Group named its first grain haulage CBH class locomotive after the location.

See also
 Wheatbelt railway lines of Western Australia

References

External links

Towns in Western Australia
Wheatbelt (Western Australia)